The Brighton razor gangs were groups of razor-wielding youths involved in racketeering on the local racecourses in the 1930s and 1940s. They formed the background for Graham Greene's novel Brighton Rock. Gangs operating in Brighton included the Sabini gang from London's Clerkenwell area.

References

See also 
 Glasgow razor gangs

Gangs in England
Brighton
1930s in England
1940s in England
History of Brighton and Hove
20th century in East Sussex